Takatomi (written: 高富 or 貴富) is a masculine Japanese given name. Notable people with the name include:

 (1835–1889), Japanese daimyō
 (born 1971), Japanese composer

See also
, domain of Japan

Japanese masculine given names